Thomas Resetarits (born Tome Rešetarić, 25 November 1939 – 18 May 2022) was an Austrian sculptor, who created art in public spaces, especially in and around churches, including the Eisenstadt Cathedral.

Life 

Tome Rešetarić was born in Stinatz, Austria, the son of Franjo and Justina Tome Rešetarić, who belonged to the Croatian minority in Burgenland. He began carving wood sculptures as a school pupil. He trained to be a stonemason in Graz from 1955, completing his training in 1957. He worked in Vienna and later for a stone industry firm in Salzburg. In 1964, he passed the master's examination in Vienna. He studied from 1965 at the Akademie der bildenden Künste Wien.

Resetarits married elementary school teacher Herta Flasch in 1966 and began working as a freelance sculptor. He travelled to Rome, Hungary, Croatia, Germany, Mexico, the U.S., India, New Guinea, South America, South Africa, and China to gain inspiration for his work. He became a member of the association Friedhof und Denkmal (cemetery and monument) in Kassel.

Resetarits worked mostly in stone, wood, and bronze. From 1970, he received many commissions from the Diocese of Eisenstadt to design altars, altar areas, and Stations of the Cross. From 1974 to 1976, he also worked as an instructor in a prison in Eisenstadt. In addition, he designed stained glass windows from 1990, received commissions for public spaces, and worked as a book illustrator.

Resetarits lived and worked in Wörterberg, Burgenland. He died at the age of 82 after a prolonged illness.

Works in public space 

 1971: Altar relief (oak), Glashütten, Burgenland
 1974: Altar area (marble), Burgenland
 1976: Altar area, Krankenhauskapelle in Güssing, Burgenland
 1980: Virgin of Mercy, portal of the Eisenstadt Cathedral, Burgenland

 1981: Flügelaltar (linden), Oberschützen, Burgenland
 1983: 15 Stations of the Cross, Woppendorf, Burgenland

 1985: Bronze door, Eisenstadt Cathedral
 1986: Altar and Stations of the Cross, Bad Tatzmannsdorf
 1987: Kontakt (bronze), rest area Bernstein, B 50

 1988: Triptychon, Kanonikerhaus in Eisenstadt, Burgenland
 1990: Altar area, Filialkirche 

 1991: Altar area (cherry wood), Burgenland

 1994: Stations of the Cross (limestone), Donnerskirchen, Burgenland
 1996: Stations of the Cross (granite), Kegalberg next to Pfarrkirche Rohrbach bei Mattersburg, Burgenland
 1996: Altar area (wood), Schwarzenbach, Lower Austria
 1999: Altar area (marble), Heiligenkreuz, Lower Austria
 2000: Altar area (serpentinit), Badersdorf
 2003: Stations of the Cross (wood), Neudorf, Burgenland
 2003: Europabrunnen, 6th , Bruckneudorf

 2007: Altar area, Rust, Burgenland, Burgenland

Gallery

Exhibitions 

 2001: Solo exhibition, Kulturzentrum Oberschützen
 2004: Kunstachse Oberschützen, Burgenland
 2010: Landesgalerie Burgenland

Book illustrations 

 1977: 
 1983: Weihnachten ist jeden Tag, Dr. J. Frank, Morsak Verlag, 

 1988: 
 1990: Du bleibst bei uns. Ein Kreuzweg, 
 2003: Die Sandalen des Moses, Alfons Jestl, publication PNº1 (Bibliothek der Provinz Weitra), 
 2007: Die Fee im Kirschbaum (drawings), Alfons Jestl, publication PNº1 (Bibliothek der Provinz Weitra),

References

Further reading 
(in German) Pädagogische Akademie of the Diocese of Graz-Seckau, June 1998.
 Franjo Maletić: Tko je tko u Hrvatskoj. (in Croatian) Golden Marketing, 1993, p. 631.
 Burgenländische Landesregierung – Abt. 7/Landesmuseum (ed.): Schnittpunkt Burgenland. Wege der Kunst ins 21. Jahrhundert, WAB vol. 145, Eisenstadt 2012, p. 200.

External links 

 
 
 Stegersbach – Bekenntnissäule (in German) stegersbach.net

1939 births
2022 deaths
20th-century Austrian sculptors
Austrian male sculptors
Austrian people of Croatian descent
People from Güssing District
Burgenland Croats